Boronuk is a rural locality (a selo), the administrative center of, and one of two settlements in addition to Machakh in Babushinsky Rural Okrug of Verkhoyansky District in the Sakha Republic, Russia, located  from Batagay, the administrative center of the district. Its population as of the 2010 Census was 307; down from 364 recorded in the 2002 Census.

References

Notes

Sources
Official website of the Sakha Republic. Registry of the Administrative-Territorial Divisions of the Sakha Republic. Verkhoyansky District. 

Rural localities in Verkhoyansky District
Yana basin